This is a list of Buddhist temples, monasteries, stupas, and pagodas in Myanmar for which there are Wikipedia articles, sorted by location.

Ayeyarwady Region

Ngapudaw
 Mawtinzun Pagoda

Pathein
 Phaung Daw U Pagoda (Pathein)
 Shwemokhtaw Pagoda

Bago Region

Bago
 Kalyani Ordination Hall
 Kyaikpun Buddha
 Mahazedi Pagoda
 Shwemawdaw Pagoda
 Shwethalyaung Buddha (Reclining Buddha)

Pyay
 Shwesandaw Pagoda (Pyay)

Taungoo
 Myazigon Pagoda

Kayin State

Hpa-an
 Kawgun Cave
 Kyauk Ka Lat Pagoda
 Saddan Cave
 Shwe Yin Myaw Pagoda
 Thit Hta Man Aung Pagoda

Magway Region

Magway
 Myathalun Pagoda

Pakokku
 Tantkyitaung Pagoda
 Thihoshin Pagoda

Yesagyo
 Pakhannge Monastery

Mandalay Region

Amarapura
 Kyauktawgyi Pagoda
 Mahagandhayon Monastery
 Nagayon Pagoda
 Pahtodawgyi

Bagan (Pagan)

 Alodawpyi Pagoda
 Ananda Temple
 Bupaya Pagoda
 Dhammayangyi Temple
 Dhammayazika Pagoda
 Gawdawpalin Temple
 Htilominlo Temple
 Lawkananda Pagoda
 Mahabodhi Temple
 Manuha Temple
 Mingalazedi Pagoda
 Payathonzu Temple
 Shwegugyi Temple
 Shwesandaw Pagoda
 Shwezigon Pagoda
 Sulamani Temple
 Tharabha Gate
 Thatbyinnyu Temple
 Upali Ordination Hall

Inwa
 Bagaya Monastery
 Lawka Tharahpu Pagoda
 Maha Aungmye Bonzan Monastery

Kyaukse
 Shwethalyaung Hill
 Shwethalyaung Pagoda
 Tamote Shinpin Shwegugyi Temple

Mandalay

 Atumashi Monastery
 Eindawya Pagoda
 Htilin Monastery
 Kuthodaw Pagoda
 Kyauktawgyi Buddha Temple (Mandalay)
 Mahamuni Buddha
 Myadaung Monastery
 Pitakataik (Mandalay)
 Salin Monastery
 Sandamuni Pagoda
 Setkyathiha Pagoda
 Shwekyimyin Pagoda
 Shwenandaw Monastery
 Taiktaw Monastery
 Tawagu Pagoda
 Yaw Mingyi Monastery

Meiktila
 Myamyinzu Pagoda

Mon State
 Kaylartha Pagoda
 Kyaikhtisaung Pagoda
 Kyaik Ne Yay Lae Pagoda
 Kyaikthanlan Pagoda
 Kyaiktiyo Pagoda
 Pa-Auk Forest Monastery
 Yadanabonmyint Monastery
 Zinkyaik Pagoda

Naypyidaw Union Territory
 Maha Thetkya Yanthi Buddha
 Phaung Daw U Pagoda (Lewe)
 Thatta Thattaha Maha Bawdi Pagoda
 Uppatasanti Pagoda
 Yan Aung Myin Shwe Lett Hla Pagoda

Rakhine State

Mrauk U
 Andaw-thein Temple
 Htukkanthein Temple
 Koe-thaung Temple
 Le-myet-hna Temple
 Ratanabon Pagoda
 Shite-thaung Temple

Sittwe
 Shwezedi Monastery

Sagaing Region
 Hsinbyume Pagoda
 Htupayon Pagoda
 Kaunghmudaw Pagoda
 Laykyun Sekkya
 Maha Bodhi Tahtaung
 Phowintaung
 Thambuddhe Pagoda

Shan State
 Bawgyo Pagoda, Hsipaw
 Hpaung Daw U Pagoda
 Maha Myat Muni Temple
 Pindaya Caves
 Shwe Indein Pagoda
 Wat Zom Khum

Tanintharyi Region
 Paw Daw Mu Pagoda
 Thein Daw Gyi Pagoda

Yangon Region

Hmawbi
 Aung Zabu Monastery

Twante
 Shwesandaw Pagoda (Twante)

Yangon (Rangoon)
 Botahtaung Pagoda
 Chaukhtatgyi Buddha Temple
 Kaba Aye Pagoda (World Peace Pagoda)
 Kyauktawgyi Buddha Temple (Yangon)
 Maha Wizaya Pagoda
 Ngahtatgyi Buddha Temple
 Shwedagon Pagoda
 Sule Pagoda
 Thayettaw Monastery
 Ye Le Pagoda

See also
 Buddhism in Myanmar
 Burmese pagoda 
 Kyaung
 Pagoda festival 
 Sand pagoda
 International Meditation Centre
 List of Buddhist temples

Notes

Sources
 BuddhaNet's Comprehensive Directory of Buddhist Temples sorted by country
 Buddhactivity Dharma Centres database

External links

 
Myanmar
Myanmar
Buddhist temples